Traitor Draža Mihailović: In the Hands of the Authority of People's Power is a book by communist Yugoslav figure Aleksandar Ranković written about the trial of  World War II Chetnik leader Draža Mihailović that denounces Mihailović.

References 

History books about World War II